Lost Tracks may refer to:

 Lost Tracks (Anouk album),  2001
 Lost Tracks (Missing Persons album), 2002
 The Lost Tracks of Danzig, 2007